Grey DeLisle (born Erin Grey Van Oosbree; August 24, 1973), sometimes credited as Grey Griffin, is an American voice actress, comedian and singer-songwriter. DeLisle is known for various roles in animated productions and video games. On September 27, 2018, she released her debut comedy act, titled "My First Comedy Special". On November 10, 2019, The Simpsons producers announced that DeLisle would replace Russi Taylor as the voice of Martin Prince and Sherri and Terri, after Taylor's death in July 2019.

In 2022, she was nominated for the Children's and Family Emmy Award for Outstanding Voice Performance in an Animated Program for her work on The Loud House.

Early life and career

DeLisle was born in Fort Ord, California, to truck driver George Van Oosbree and singer Joanna Ruth, and grew up in a Mexican-American household. She has described herself as "a 75% white woman raised by my Mexican grandma". Her parents separated when she was young. She has two brothers. DeLisle's mother became a born-again Pentecostal when she was eleven and she was later raised by her maternal grandmother, Eva Flores, a vocalist who performed with salsa musician Tito Puente. She credits her father's love of country music as the biggest influence on her musical taste. She attended Chula Vista High School in the same graduating class as Mario Lopez. In her late teens, she started singing old gospel tunes, and entered the world of comedy on the advice of a friend. In her comedy routine, DeLisle imitated voices. Her impressions earned the attention of a casting director and was advised to take up voice acting. At this time, she went back to her musical ambitions but also took classes in voice-overs. She soon began working with talent agent Sandy Schnarr.

In the Scooby-Doo franchise, DeLisle began voicing Daphne Blake with the direct-to-video film Scooby-Doo and the Cyber Chase, a role she inherited from her friend and teacher Mary Kay Bergman following the latter's suicide. She later said of Bergman, "It was an interesting turn of events to get to play Daphne, but I'm so glad that I have the role, and I was glad that I was able to carry that on for her. She set the bar very high." DeLisle also credited the work for helping her maintain her music career, stating "I think Daphne just saved country music." In 2019, Warner Bros. announced that Amanda Seyfried would be voicing Daphne in the animated film Scoob! instead of DeLisle. Both DeLisle and Matthew Lillard, the current voice of Shaggy Rogers were upset about not being contacted about the decision to recast for their roles for the film. Around the time of the film's release, DeLisle said that she did not bear any hard feelings towards Seyfried or her performance in it.

DeLisle has also done some modeling; she appears on the cover art for the 2017 Nintendo Switch game 1-2-Switch as a woman who appears on the upper-right corner, with her nose doctored to be larger than it actually is.

Personal life
Her first marriage was to Christopher DeLisle in 1992. The two later divorced in 1993. In 2002, she married Murry Hammond of the country band Old 97's; their courtship and wedding were featured in an episode of A Wedding Story. She gave birth to their son Jefferson Texas "Tex" Hammond in 2007. They divorced in 2010. She later met Jared Griffin through Twitter, and the two married on June 27, 2012. The couple's son Harlan was born in 2014, and a daughter named Mariposa followed in 2016. Their marriage ended the following year.

Discography

Albums
 The Small Time (2000)
 Homewrecker (2002)
 Bootlegger, Vol. 1 (2003)
 The Graceful Ghost (2004)
 Iron Flowers (2005)
 Loggerheads soundtrack (2005)
 Anchored in Love: A Tribute to June Carter Cash (2007)

Singles
 2006 – "Willie We Have Missed You", song on Beautiful Dreamer: The Songs of Stephen Foster (2006)

References

External links

 
 
 

1973 births
Living people
20th-century American actresses
21st-century American actresses
American film actresses
American voice actresses
American television actresses
American video game actresses
American alternative country singers
American women country singers
American country singer-songwriters
American women singer-songwriters
Actresses from California
Singer-songwriters from California
American impressionists (entertainers)
Cartoon Network people
Nickelodeon people
People from Fort Ord, California
21st-century American women singers
Comedians from California
20th-century American comedians
21st-century American comedians
21st-century American singers
Country musicians from California